The Little River is a  river located in central New Hampshire in the United States.  Its outflow travels via the Big River, Suncook River, and Merrimack River to the Gulf of Maine, an arm of the Atlantic Ocean.

The Little River begins on the west side of the Blue Hills Range in Strafford, New Hampshire. It flows northwest, gaining the outlet of the Willey Ponds, and joins the Big River just north of the village of South Barnstead.

See also

List of rivers of New Hampshire

References

Tributaries of the Merrimack River
Rivers of New Hampshire
Rivers of Strafford County, New Hampshire
Rivers of Belknap County, New Hampshire